Eremococcus is a genus of bacteria from the family of Aerococcaceae with one known species (Eremococcus coleocola).

References

Lactobacillales
Bacteria genera
Monotypic bacteria genera